Ellis Lloyd  was a Welsh politician who sat in the House of Commons in 1614.

Lloyd was the son of Robert Lloyd of Rhiwgoch and his wife Margaret Nanney, daughter of Hugh Nanney of Nannau, Dolgelly. In 1614, he was elected Member of Parliament for Merioneth.

Lloyd's daughter Jane married  Henry Wynn later MP for Merioneth.

References

Year of birth missing
Year of death missing
Members of the Parliament of England (pre-1707) for constituencies in Wales
People from Merionethshire
Place of birth missing
English MPs 1614
17th-century Welsh politicians